Quidditch, also known as Quadball, in Australia is played by a mixture of university and community teams. Due to the geographic demographics of the country, most major competitive tournaments are held in the eastern states. There are currently over 30 registered teams in the country.

Organisations
Quidditch in Australia is governed by Quadball Australia (formerly Quidditch Australia and the Australian Quidditch Association), a non-profit organisation founded in 2011 as a Facebook group intended to act as a network for quidditch teams and players within Australia to communicate with one another. It is managed by a board of seven directors on a rotating 2-year term system with further volunteer staff, and currently chaired by Luke Derrick. Quidditch Australia is affiliated with the International Quidditch Association. Quidditch Australia uses the IQA rulebook for official gameplay, with some minor exceptions.

Quadball Australia manages the membership and insurance of all players in the country, in addition to managing the country's most prolific tournaments such as the Australian Quidditch Championships and State Shield. Regular club seasons are managed by their respective state bodies: Quidditch New South Wales (which also mangages quidditch in the Australian Capital Territory), Victorian Quidditch Association, Queensland Association of Quidditch, South Australian Quidditch Association and Western Australian Quidditch Association.

National team

The Drop Bears are the Australian national team, named after the folklorian koala-like species. The Drop Bears competed at the inaugural 2012 IQA Cup (then called the Summer Games), the first world-wide quidditch competition where they came in third out of five teams. They defeated reigning champions The United States in 2016 with a score of 150*–130. Despite being tipped to win the cup again in 2018, the Australian National Team competed in Italy finishing 5th, defeated by the United States in the early stages of the semifinals. 

† The 2020 World Cup was initially postponed to 2021 due to COVID-19, and further postponed to 2023.

Competitions

Australian Quidditch Championships (QUAFL)
The Australian Quidditch Championships, previously and sometimes still colloquially known as QUAFL is the biggest quidditch tournament in Australia. It is held annually in November/December, crowning the Australian national club champion for that year. The first official name for the tournament was the Oceania Regional Championships, but was more affectionately known as "QUAFL" which was later given the backronym "Quidditch United Australian Federated League". The inaugural tournament was held in 2011 at the University of New South Wales, starting with just 5 teams.

Clubs from across the country bid to host the tournament every year, and the tournament was hosted by Sydney-based clubs until 2015, when it was hosted by Melbourne's Monash Muggles. In 2016 and 2017, the tournament saw a move to the Australian Institute of Sport in Canberra, hosting a record high of 25 teams in 2017. The championships were hosted in Queensland for the first time in 2018, and were last held at Kayess Park, Minto in 2019, before being cancelled both in 2020 and 2021 due to Covid-19 restrictions at the time.

The structure of the tournament traditionally changes each year depending on the number of registered teams and choices of organisers. More recently, teams have been randomly split into pools based on their respective end of season state rankings, with top teams from each pool progressing to elimination bracket play.

The 2020 Championship due to be hosted in the Gold Coast or USC, and the 2021 Championship due to be hosted at La Trobe University, were cancelled due to the COVID-19 Pandemic.

Australian Quidditch Championship results 
Note that an asterisk (*) signifies a snitch catch.

State Shield
State Shield (previously Quidditch State of Origin after the football tournament of the same name), is an annual Australian quidditch competition established in 2016 as part of a skills camp training exercise at the annual Quid Camp. The tournament was created due to an increasing need for a state-based tournament, however as the majority of the players resided in Queensland, New South Wales, and Victoria (due to Australian geographical demographics) these are the only states to currently compete in the tournament.

Participating state teams include Victorian Leadbeaters (A), Victorian Honeybeaters (B), New South Wales Bluetongues (A), New South Wales Bluebottles (B), and the Queensland Thunderbirds.

Past State Shield results 

The 2020 and 2021 State Shields were cancelled due to COVID-19 pandemic.

NSW Quidditch League (NQL)
Organised by Quidditch New South Wales, the NQL (previously known as Triwiz) is the year long state championship in Sydney and surrounding cities, which started in 2011 and was formalised when the Quidditch NSW state body was created. The competition was split into 2 divisions in 2018, and currently contains 14 teams across Sydney, Wollongong, Newcastle and Canberra.

† Due to inclement weather and injuries, both teams agreed not to play the Grand Final and share the 2015 state title.

Victoria Cup
Organised by the Victorian Quidditch Association, the Victoria Cup is the year long state championship in Melbourne. The inaugural cup in 2014 was won by the Monash Muggles, and followed on from other local tournaments.

Midwinter Cup
The Midwinter cup is held annually in Newcastle featuring both teams from NSW and interstate. The 2014 winners were the UNSW Snapes on a Plane. In 2015, the tournament was won by the hosts, the Newcastle Fireballs. In 2016, a vastly outnumbered Australian National University and University of the Sunshine Coast collaboration team, the ANUSC Dement-Owls, defeated the Newcastle Fireballs in the grand final to claim the Midwinter cup. In 2017, the winners were the newly formed Sydney City Serpents.

The Midwinter Cup was not held in the 2020 and 2021 seasons due to the COVID-19 pandemic, but is due to be held on the 9th and 10 July in 2022.

Melbourne Mudbash
The Melbourne Mudbash is held annually in the middle of the year in Melbourne. Local teams are joined by interstate teams and teams composed of mercenary players. In 2013, the Melbourne Manticores came out on top of the four local and two other teams competing, and in 2014 the Monash Muggles were the best of the six local and four other teams to compete.

Fantasy Tournaments
Held outside of the regular seasons, various fantasy tournaments across the country include Valkyries Fantasy (November), Victorian Fantasy (February), Sunshine Coast Fantasy (April), Macarthur Fantasy (January), and Pink Up Campbelltown Charity Tournament (October).

Australian Wheelchair Quidditch Championships (QWAFL)
Wheelchair quidditch was first introduced into regular quidditch tournaments in 2012, and ran at the same time and venue as the regular championships. Due to the logistical difficulties and lack of interest, the competition has not run since 2016.

Teams
There are several teams/clubs registered with Quadball Australia across all states and territories except Tasmania and Northern Territory. The following is a list of existing or past teams that have been registered with Quadball Australia.

Australian Capital Territory 
 Australian National University Owls (formerly ANU Nargles)

New South Wales
 Darlington Dragons
 Eastern Sydney Universities (a merger of UTS Opaleyes and UNSW Snapes on a Plane)
 Dawnbreakers
 Nightbringers
 Daywalkers
 Hills Hippogriffs†
 Illawarra Unregistered Animagi†
 Macarthur Weasleys†
 Macquarie Marauders
 Newcastle Fireballs
 North Sydney Nightmares
 South West Horntails
 Southern Snidgets†
 Sydney City Serpents 
 University of New South Wales Snapes on a Plane†
 University of Sydney
 Unforgivables
 Unbreakables
 Unspeakables
 University of Technology Sydney Opaleyes†
 University of Western Sydney Thestrals†
 Valkyries
 Western Sydney Spartans†
 Wollongong Warriors (University of Wollongong)†

Queensland
 Brisbane City Bin Chickens 
 Griffith University Grindylows†
 James Cook University Galleons†
 Queensland University of Technology Lycans
 University of Queensland Dumblebees 
 University of the Sunshine Coast 
 Dementors
 Nifflers

South Australia
 Adelaide Augureys
 Flinders Fantastic Beasts
 Glenelg Gargoyles

Victoria
 Basilisks Quidditch Club
 La Trobe University Trolls†
 Melbourne Manticores
 Melbourne Ravens
 Melbourne Unicorns
 Blue  
Orange
 Monash University 
 Muggles
 Mudbloods
 South Melbourne Centaurs
 Whomping Willows Quidditch Club

Western Australia
 Curtin Chimeras
 ECU Centaurs
 Murdoch Mandrakes
 Perth Phoenixes (due to the geographical isolation of Western Australia, teams from WA form together under this name to at national tournaments)
 University of Western Australia Undesirables
† Developing team, non-official, not currently competing or defunct

References

Quidditch
Sport in Australia